SSV-33 Ural  (ССВ-33 Урал; NATO reporting name: Kapusta, Russian for "cabbage") was a command and control naval ship operated by the Soviet Navy. SSV-33s hull was derived from that of the nuclear powered s with nuclear marine propulsion. SSV-33 served in electronic intelligence, missile tracking, space tracking, and communications relay roles. Due to high operating costs, SSV-33 was laid up in 1989.

The onboard radio reconnaissance system was called "Coral"; this involved two computer types: "Elbrus" and several "EC-1046" computers.

SSV-33 carried only light defensive weapons. These were two AK-176 76 mm guns, four AK-630 30 mm guns, and four quadruple Igla missile mounts.

SSV-33 was assigned to the Pacific Fleet, but there was no pier large enough for the ship. She was forced to anchor out. Machinery had to remain running while at anchor to support other systems and its crew; the ship became a floating barracks. She never went to sea, while her powerful radioelectronic equipment gradually began to decay.

The initial value of the ship's disposal contract was $310 million. The work was performed in the Bay of Bolshoy Kamen in Primorsky region and completed by late 2018.

In popular culture
 In the novel World War Z, by Max Brooks, Ural is based at Ulithi as the broadcast base for the worldwide radio network, Radio Free Earth.
 A fictional duplicate, Ural II, is seen in the anime movie Evangelion: 2.0 You Can (Not) Advance, used as an external command centre for a NERV research base.

See also
 List of ships of the Soviet Navy
 List of ships of Russia by project number
 Kirov-class battlecruiser

References

External links 

Nuclear ships of the Soviet Navy
1983 ships
Maritime vessels related to spaceflight
Ships of the Soviet space program
Ships built in the Soviet Union
Ships built at the Baltic Shipyard